This is a list of Buddhist temples, monasteries, stupas, and pagodas in Indonesia for which there are Wikipedia articles, sorted by location.

Bali
 Vihara Buddha Banjar

Java

East Java
 Candi Jabung
 Candi Surawana

Central Java 
 Candi Banyunibo
 Candi Borobudur
 Candi Kalasan
 Candi Mendut
 Candi Pawon
 Candi Plaosan
 Candi Sari
 Candi Sewu
 Vihara Buddhagaya Watugong

West Java 
 Candi Batujaya

Sumatra 
 Candi Bahal
 Candi Muara Takus
 Candi Muaro Jambi
 Lumbini Natural Park
 Maha Vihara Maitreya

See also
 Buddhism in Indonesia
 Candi of Indonesia
 Ashin Jinarakkhita
 Parwati Soepangat
 Indonesian Esoteric Buddhism
 List of Buddhist temples

Notes

External links

 BuddhaNet's Comprehensive Directory of Buddhist Temples sorted by country
 Buddhactivity Dharma Centres database

 
 
Indonesia
Buddhist temples